Rovereto is a city in Trentino, Italy

Rovereto may also refer to other places in Italy:

Rovereto railway station, a station in Rovereto on the Brenner Railway Verona–Innsbruck line
Rovereto (Milan Metro), a rail station in Milan
Rovereto, a frazione in Cerignale, Emilia-Romagna
Rovereto, a frazione in Novi di Modena, Emilia-Romagna
Rovereto, a frazione in Ostellato, Emilia-Romagna
Rovereto, a frazione in Credera Rubbiano, Lombardy
Rovereto, a frazione in Gavi, Piedmont